Peter Petráš (born 7 May 1979) is a Slovak football manager and a former defender.

Club career

Slovak teams
Peter Petráš played for three different teams in Slovakia between 1999 and 2006. Peter capped 120 times in this period, scoring 3 goals.

FC Saturn
In January 2006 Petráš joined Saturn Ramenskoe in Russia, where he played 54 matches in 3 years.

ŠK Slovan Bratislava
After three years in Saturn, Petráš joined ŠK Slovan Bratislava in January 2009. He spent a year there and played 24 times, scoring 2 goals.

PFC Levski Sofia
On 25 February 2010, Petráš signed 6-months contract with PFC Levski Sofia. Peter chose kit number 21. Peter made his official debut for Levski on 7 March 2010 against Minyor Pernik. The result of the match was 3:1 for Levski. Petráš played very well during the match. On 14 March 2010, he was sent off for a second booking in the away match against Litex Lovech.

In 2009/2010 season, after couple of bad games and results, Levski however achieved qualifying for UEFA Europa League becoming 3rd in the final ranking.

His contract with Levski expired in June 2010 and was not renewed.

International career
Petráš has been playing for Slovakia national football team since 2006 He has already made 9 appearances for the side.

Coaching career
In the summer 2019, Petráš was appointed player-manager of Prešov.

Club career statistics
This statistic includes domestic league, domestic cup and European tournaments.

Last update: 7 June 2013

Awards
  Slovak Superliga 2009

References

External links
 
 
 

1979 births
Living people
People from Trnava District
Sportspeople from the Trnava Region
Slovak footballers
Slovak football managers
Slovak expatriate footballers
Slovakia international footballers
FK Senica players
FK Dubnica players
FK Inter Bratislava players
FC Petržalka players
FC Saturn Ramenskoye players
ŠK Slovan Bratislava players
PFC Levski Sofia players
1. FC Tatran Prešov players
FC Nitra players
Slovak Super Liga players
Russian Premier League players
First Professional Football League (Bulgaria) players
Expatriate footballers in Russia
Expatriate footballers in Bulgaria
Association football defenders
Slovak expatriate sportspeople in Russia
Slovak expatriate sportspeople in Bulgaria
1. FC Tatran Prešov managers
3. Liga (Slovakia) managers
5. Liga (Slovakia) managers
4. Liga (Slovakia) managers